A gaida is a bagpipe from Southeastern Europe.

Construction

Bag
Gaida bags are generally of sheep or goat hide. Different regions have different ways of treating the hide. The simplest methods involve just the use of salt, while more complex treatments involve milk, flour, and the removal of fur. The hide is normally turned inside out so that the fur is on the inside of the bag, as this helps with moisture buildup within the bag. The stocks into which the chanters and blowpipe and drone fit are called "glavini" (главини) in Bulgarian. These can be made out of cornel wood or animal horn.

Blow pipe
The blow pipe is a short, conical wooden or bone tube in which the player blows to refill the bag. At the end of the blow pipe that is within the bag, there is a small return valve of leather or felt which allows air into the bag via the blow pipe but not back out. In some more primitive gaida there is no flap, but the player blocks returning air with his tongue during breaths.

Reeds 
Each chanter is fitted with a reed made from reed (arundo donax), bamboo, or elder. In regional languages these are variously termed lemellas, Piska, or pisak. A more modern variant for the reed is a combination of a cotton phenolic (Hgw2082) material from which the body of the reed is made and a clarinet reed cut to size in order to fit the body. These type of reeds produce a louder sound and are not so sensitive to humidity and temperature changes.

Chanter
The chanter (gaidunitza, gaidanitsa, gajdenica, gajdica, zurle) is the pipe on which the melody is played. Different gaida may have a conical bore (Bulgaria), or cylindrical bore (Macedonia and other regions). Popular woods include boxwood (shimshir) cornel wood, plum wood or other fruit wood. A distinctive feature of the gaida's chanter (which it shares with a number of other Eastern European bagpipes) is the "flea-hole" (also known as a mumbler or voicer, marmorka) which is covered by the index finger of the left hand. The flea-hole is smaller than the rest and usually consists of a small tube that is made out of metal or a chicken or duck feather. Uncovering the flea-hole raises any note played by a half step, and it is used in creating the musical ornamentation that gives Balkan music its unique character.

Some types of gaida can have a double bored chanter, such as the Serbian three-voiced gajde. It has eight fingerholes: the top four are covered by the thumb and the first three fingers of the left hand, then the four fingers of the right hand cover the remaining four holes.

Drone
The drone (ruchilo, ison, prdaljka, prdak, brčalo) is a long pipe which provides a constant harmony note, and thus has no finger-holes. It is generally a long, three-piece tube with a note much lower than that of the chanter.

Types
Gaidas in the Balkans include, but are not limited to:
 Kaba gaida – a large Bulgarian bagpipe of the Rhodope mountains which has a hexagonal and rounded drone. Often described as a deep-sounding gaida
 Dzhura gaida – a bagpipe typically found in Bulgaria which has a straight conical drone. In contrast to the kaba gaida, this is a higher pitched instrument
 Macedonian gaida – Played in the region of Macedonia, the bagpipe is structurally between a kaba and dzhura gaida and is described as a medium pitched gaida

Players and makers
Kostadin Varimezov
Dafo Trendafilov
Vassil Bebelekov
Pece Atanasovski

See also
 For other types of bagpipes with similar name, see gaita

Notes

References

External links
 The presence of the gaida in Greece

Bagpipes
Albanian musical instruments
Greek musical instruments
Croatian musical instruments
Serbian musical instruments
Slovenian musical instruments
Bulgarian musical instruments
Bosnian musical instruments
Macedonian musical instruments
Turkish musical instruments

sr:Гајде